Arif Mahmood Gill is a Pakistani politician who was a Member of the Provincial Assembly of the Punjab, from 2002 to 2007 and again from May 2013 to May 2018.

Early life and education
He was born on 20 February 1970 in Samundri.

He graduated from Bahauddin Zakariya University in 2002.

Political career
He was elected to the Provincial Assembly of the Punjab as a candidate of Pakistan Muslim League (Q) (PML-Q) from Constituency PP-59 (Faisalabad-IX) in 2002 Pakistani general election. He received 24,457 votes and defeated Muhammad Tahir Chaudhry, a candidate of Pakistan Peoples Party (PPP).

He ran for the seat of the Provincial Assembly of the Punjab as a candidate of PML-Q from Constituency PP-59 (Faisalabad-IX) in 2008 Pakistani general election, but was unsuccessful. He received 25,163 votes and lost the seat to Rana Muhammad Farooq Saeed Khan.

He was re-elected to the Provincial Assembly of the Punjab as a candidate of Pakistan Muslim League (N) (PML-N) from Constituency PP-59 (Faisalabad-IX) in 2013 Pakistani general election. He received 48,397 votes and defeated Rana Muhammad Farooq Saeed Khan.

References

Living people
Punjab MPAs 2013–2018
1973 births
Pakistan Muslim League (N) politicians
People from Samundri
Bahauddin Zakariya University alumni
Punjab MPAs 2002–2007